Ripcord Networks was a voice and video cryptographic security company. Their headquarters was in San Mateo, California in the United States.

Ripcord Networks was founded in 2003. Board members included Steve Wozniak, Apple Computer's co-founder; John McAfee, McAfee Antivirus founder, Ellen Hancock, the former CEO of Exodus Communications, former CTO of Apple Computer, and former EVP of IBM. Ripcord's founder and CEO was Alex Fielding.

External links
 www.ripcord.com
 Wired News reference
 
 
 

Software companies based in California
Defunct software companies of the United States